Cristina Abuhazi Garcia (born 4 December 1980 in Caracas, Venezuela) is a Venezuelan television host, model, and actress. She is currently working on a variety of TV Shows in Sony Youtube America Latina Network in the United States.

She also appears in Show Business Extra  by MTV3 Tr3s (United States) and Meridiano Televisión (Venezuela).

Abuhazi has appeared in several soap operas and hosted a number of programs on Venezuelan television.

Filmography

TV show host 
 Sony Entertainment Television (Latin America), (2013)
 Show Business Extra, MTV3 Tr3s (2013)
 99 TV (2012)
 Un momento Diferente, Canal i (2009-2010)
 Pura Vida Nocturna,  featuring Arturo de los Ríos, Canal de Noticias (2008)

TV series 
 Corazón Valiente, Telemundo (2012-2013)
 Una Maid en Manhattan, Telemundo (2011-2012) 
 Mi Prima Ciela, RCTV (2007)
 Te tengo en Salsa, RCTV (2007)

Radio 
 Fusible fm - Radio 100.7 FM Ateneo de Caracas (2006-2007)

Personal life 
Abuhazi is a lawyer graduated in 2003 in the Facultad de Derecho of Universidad Santa María (Caracas) Venezuela.

She is a marathon runner. Cristina has run the New York City Marathon two times, once in 2007   and 2008 as well as five half marathons in her hometown of Miami.

Cristina is involved in the fight against breast cancer participating in the Asociación Civil sin fines de lucro SenosAyuda  and the McHappy Day  with the McDonald's Venezuela Foundation   finding a cure for infantile paralysis (Poliomyelitis) in an annual event, where a percentage of the day's sales go to charity. It is the signature fundraising event for Ronald McDonald House Charities.

External links 
 Cristina Abuhazi Official web site

References

1980 births
Living people
People from Caracas
Venezuelan television personalities
Venezuelan television presenters
Venezuelan telenovela actresses
Venezuelan women lawyers
Venezuelan people of Lebanese descent
Venezuelan beauty pageant winners
Venezuelan emigrants to the United States
Actresses from Miami
Universidad Santa María (Venezuela) alumni
Venezuelan women television presenters
21st-century American women